Christopher Miles Bush (born 12 June 1992) is an English professional footballer who plays as a defender for Boreham Wood.

Early life
Bush was born in Leytonstone, Greater London.

Club career

Bush came through the youth system of Brentford and spent a loan spell during the 2009–10 season with Conference side Salisbury City. At the start of the 2010–11 season he spent a month on loan at Conference South team Woking. As soon as his loan spell finished at Woking, Bush was again sent out on loan, this time to Conference National side AFC Wimbledon for four months until January 2011. He also spent time on loan at Thurrock.

In June 2011, Bush signed permanently for the newly promoted Dons side in League Two after rejecting a new contract at Griffin Park. During his time at Kingsmeadow he scored what his manager Terry Brown described as a "ridiculous own goal" as the Dons were thrashed 5–2 by Crawley Town on 22 October 2011.

On 21 June 2012, Bush signed for Gateshead. On 8 January 2013, Bush joined  Lincoln City on a one-month loan. On 28 March 2013, Bush joined  Hereford United on loan for the remainder of the 2012–13 season. On 25 April 2013, Bush was one of seven players released by Gateshead.

On 19 June 2013, Bush signed a one-year contract with Hereford United.

On 11 June 2014, Bush signed a one-year contract with Welling United.

In May 2015 he left Welling United and signed for Lincoln City.

On 26 June 2016, Bush dropped down a division to join National League South club Chelmsford City. On 6 August 2016, Bush scored on his debut for Chelmsford in a 2–2 draw against Truro City.

On 25 August 2017, Bush signed for Ebbsfleet United.

He moved to Bromley in May 2019. On 28 September 2019, following an injury to goalkeeper Mark Cousins, Bush played in goal for the rest of the match against Yeovil Town as there was no substitute goalkeeper. He conceded three goals in a 3–1 loss.

He left Bromley and signed for Boreham Wood on 31 December 2022.

Career statistics

Honours
Bromley
FA Trophy: 2021–22

References

1992 births
Living people
English footballers
Association football defenders
Brentford F.C. players
Salisbury City F.C. players
Woking F.C. players
AFC Wimbledon players
Thurrock F.C. players
Gateshead F.C. players
Lincoln City F.C. players
Hereford United F.C. players
Welling United F.C. players
Chelmsford City F.C. players
Ebbsfleet United F.C. players
National League (English football) players
English Football League players
People from Leytonstone
Bromley F.C. players
Boreham Wood F.C. players
Outfield association footballers who played in goal